"She Loves Me Back" is a single by New Zealand band DD Smash. It was released in 1985 as the fourth single from The Optimist. It is a cover of the Luther Vandross song from the album Forever, for Always, for Love  and is the only DD Smash single to be a cover. The song reached No. 36 on the New Zealand music charts.

References

1985 singles
DD Smash songs
Songs written by Luther Vandross
1985 songs
Mushroom Records singles